Leoncio "Jun" Badilla Evasco Jr. (born March 29, 1944) is a Filipino politician who served as Secretary of the Cabinet from 2016 to 2018 and is currently the Presidential Adviser on Streamlining of Government Processes under the Duterte administration since 2020. Before he was appointed as the Cabinet secretary, he was the Mayor of Maribojoc town in Bohol from 2007 to 2016. He was an ordained priest, being ordained in 1970, when he joined the Communist Party of the Philippines and its armed wing, the New People's Army, in 1974.

Early life and education 
Evasco was born in Maribojoc in Bohol province on March 29, 1944. He finished his AB degree in Philosophy and Theology in Seminario Mayor de San Carlos in Cebu City in 1966 and 1970, respectively. He obtained a master's degree in Ateneo de Davao University.

Career 
Evasco was ordained a priest in 1970. He was assigned as priest in Dauis, Baclayon and Catigbian all in Bohol. A raid by soldiers in his convent in Catigbian in 1974 pushed him to join the underground Communist Party of the Philippines and its armed wing, the New People's Army. In 1983 he was caught while presiding over the wedding of a comrade in Midsayap, North Cotabato. He was tortured and four of his those arrested with him was summarily executed. Evasco was prosecuted by then prosecutor Rodrigo Duterte for rebellion. Following the EDSA People Power Revolution he was one of the political detainees ordered released from jail by then President Cory Aquino. After his release, Evasco worked as secretary general of Samahan ng Ex-Detainees Laban sa Detensyon at Aresto. He served as campaign manager of Duterte when he run in 1988 mayoral elections. He served as OIC of the city engineer's office from 1989 to 1990. Evasco headed the economic enterprise office before being appointed as chief of staff of Duterte.

Maribojoc Mayor 
Evasco ran for mayor of Maribojoc in 2007 and won despite being away from the town for 3 decades. He won re-election in 2010 and 2013. Under his leadership Maribojoc received the Galing Pook award for 2011 for its Cadastral Survey and Simultaneous Systematic Adjudication Project. The town was also conferred the Seal of Good Housekeeping by the Department of the Interior and Local Government in 2010 and 2011. In the wake of the 2013 Bohol earthquake he was involved in a controversy with Philippine Red Cross volunteers regarding the distribution of relief goods to the victims. The controversy led to the prevention of Red Cross volunteers from entering Maribojoc.

References

1944 births
20th-century Filipino Roman Catholic priests
Filipino activists
Living people
Cabinet Secretaries of the Philippines
Chairpersons of the Housing and Urban Development Coordinating Council of the Philippines
Mayors of places in Bohol
People from Bohol
University of San Carlos alumni
Ateneo de Davao University alumni
Duterte administration cabinet members
Marcos martial law victims